A Resistance is a 2019 South Korean historical drama film directed by Cho Min-ho, starring Go Ah-sung, Kim Sae-byuk, Kim Ye-eun, Jeong Ha-dam and Ryu Kyung-soo.

Summary 
Yu Gwan Sun was imprisoned in Seodaemun Prison since March 1, 1919. One day, when director Joe Min-ho visited the Seodaemun Prison History Hall, he came to see Yu Gwan-sun's photo, and this film was the start of the film, featuring a soulful but powerful sound. Afterwards, director Joe Min-ho recalled the stories about Yu Gwan-sun and the '8th room women', who died in the harsh environment.

Yu Gwan Sun had an independence movement even when she was in that prison and had not given up on any torture. People watched the movie and nobody could call her as a criminal who should be in a prison. She had seen her parents killed by the Japanese soldier, and her life after that Independence movement had to be fill with all the tortures at the age of seventeen. When she was in prison, she said, "We have to shout for independence until the last day of the last one"

Cast
Go Ah-sung as Yu Gwan-sun
Kim Sae-byuk
Kim Ye-eun
Jeong Ha-dam
Jin Ho-eun as South prisoner	
Ryu Kyung-soo as Nishida / Jung Chun-young
Choi Moo-sung

Production 
Principal photography began on October 29, 2018, and wrapped on November 30, 2018.

Awards and nominations

References

External links

2019 films
2019 biographical drama films
South Korean biographical drama films
South Korean black-and-white films
Drama films based on actual events
Lotte Entertainment films
Films set in Korea under Japanese rule
South Korean historical drama films
2019 drama films
2010s South Korean films